2-methylacetoacetyl-CoA thiolase may refer to:

 Acetyl-CoA C-acetyltransferase
 Acetyl-CoA C-acyltransferase